Vincent Kamphuis (born 7 May 1980 in Epe) is a professional Dutch darts player who plays in Professional Darts Corporation events.

Darts career
He earned a PDC Tour Card in 2016, and qualified for two PDC European Tour events. He also qualified for the 2016 Players Championship Finals, as the 54th seed. He defeated 11th seed James Wilson in the first round, before losing to fellow countryman Jelle Klaasen in the second round.

References

External links
Profile and stats on Darts Database

1980 births
Living people
Dutch darts players
Professional Darts Corporation former tour card holders